Design For All may refer to:

Design for All (in ICT), Design for All in the field of Information and Communication Technologies
Design for All (design philosophy)
Design For All (product line), a range of designer products made available at discount retailers by the Target Corporation